Boczkowice refers to the following places in Poland:

 Boczkowice, Lesser Poland Voivodeship
 Boczkowice, Świętokrzyskie Voivodeship